This is an overview of religion by country or territory in 2010 according to a 2012
Pew Research Center report. The article Religious information by country gives information from The World Factbook of the CIA and the U.S. Department of State.

World

Religions by country

Africa

Americas

Asia

Europe

Oceania

See also
 Religion
 Faith
 Theocracy
 Buddhism by country
 Christianity by country (Catholic Church by country, Protestantism by country, Eastern Orthodoxy by country and Oriental Orthodoxy by country)
 Hinduism by country
 Islam by country 
 Judaism by country or Jewish population by country
 List of religious populations
 Importance of religion by country
 List of countries by irreligion
 Sikhism by country
 Religion and geography
 Religious information by country
 State religion

Notes

References

 Adherents.com World Religions Religion Statistics Geography Church Statistics 
 BBC News's Muslims in Europe: Country guide
 CIA FactBook
 Religious Intelligence
 The University of Virginia
 The US State Department's International Religious Freedom Report 2007
 The US State Department's Background Notes
 Vipassana Foundation's Buddhists around the world
 World Statesmen
 Catholic Hierarchy's Its Bishops and Dioceses, Current and Past

External links
 Geographical Distribution of Major World Religions (showing regional variations inside the same country)

 

Religion-related lists by country
 
Religion-related lists